The 4th District of the Pennsylvania House of Representatives is located in northwest Pennsylvania and has been represented by Jake Banta since 2023.

District profile
The 4th Pennsylvania House of Representatives District is located in Erie County and includes the following areas:

 Amity Township
 Concord Township
 Franklin Township
 Corry
 Edinboro
 Elgin
 Girard Township
 Greenfield Township
 Lake City
 LeBoeuf Township
 McKean
 McKean Township
 Mill Village
 North East
 North East Township
 Platea
 Union City
 Union Township
 Venango Township
 Washington Township
 Waterford
 Waterford Township
 Wattsburg
 Wayne Township

Representatives

Recent election results

References

External links
District map from the United States Census Bureau
Pennsylvania House Legislative District Maps from the Pennsylvania Redistricting Commission.  
Population Data for District 04 from the Pennsylvania Redistricting Commission.

Government of Erie County, Pennsylvania
4